Stadttheater Amberg is a theatre in Amberg, Bavaria, Germany.

Theatres in Bavaria